"Mein Block" ("My hood") is a song by German rapper Sido and the first single of his debut album Maske. The single was successful in the German charts and Sido's breakthrough in Germany. The single was in the top 20.

Background 
The track is a hymn to his former 'hood' in Berlin and the answer to "Mein Block" by Blumentopf. Beathoavenz produced a remix of the song, which can be heard in the music video and appeared on Aggro Ansage Nr. 3. Other variants and covers have been made, including by Rainer von Vielen.

Music video 
In the music video, Tony D appeared for the first time in public and played "the guy with the punch ring".

Charts

Weekly charts

Year-end charts

References 

2004 singles
2004 songs